The 2008 South American Under-20 Women's Football Championship was the third edition of South American under-20 women's football championship. It was held from 7 to 23 March 2008 in Porto Alegre and Bagé, Brazil. Team Brazil won this championship for the third time in a row.

First round

Group A

Group B

Final round

References

2008
Women
International women's association football competitions hosted by Brazil
2008 in women's association football
South
2008 in youth association football